Lee Donoghue (born 12 October 1983) is a New Zealand actor best known for his role as Hunter McKay on New Zealand soap opera Shortland Street.

Early life
Lee grew up in Lower Hutt but he also lived in Perth, Australia for 3 years when he was younger. He attended local Catholic boys college Saint Bernard's College, finishing in 2001, where he was involved in cricket, debating and was a prefect. His family has two cats, a British Blue called Molley and Zane, who is a Birman.

Acting
Lee's acting career began when a friend of the family suggested his mother take him to a talent agency, which they did and he quickly gained work acting in commercials. His first taste of acting came at 8 years old when he won a starring role in a TVNZ advertising campaign.

He was then given a small role in television mini-series Fall Out in which he played Byron Lange. After that he went on to take on roles in shows such as The Tribe and the British production Atlantis High. During this time he also took part in Young and Hungry, a youth amateur theatre.

In 2006 he was part way through gaining his qualifications from Wellington's Toi Whakaari New Zealand Drama School, when he was offered the role of Hunter McKay, the wayward son of Callum McKay and Justine Jones on New Zealand soap opera Shortland Street. His first scenes were aired in December 2006, since debuting he has gone on to star in several major storylines such as him and onscreen sister Sophie tormenting Scarlett Valentine to the brink of her trying to run them down with her father's car and getting involved with a 34-year-old widow who worked with his parents.

Filmography

Personal life
He recently became involved with an online support site for people dealing with depression called The Lowdown.

He was a contestant in the 2007 Cleo Bachelor of The Year. During this time he was featured in the Cleo Bachelors Calendar.

References

External links
Lee's TVNZ Profile

1983 births
Living people
New Zealand male film actors
New Zealand male television actors
New Zealand male soap opera actors
People educated at St Bernard's College, Lower Hutt
20th-century New Zealand male actors
21st-century New Zealand male actors